Erling Drangsholt (October 29, 1885 –  November 20, 1950) was a Norwegian actor.

Filmography 
 1927: Den glade enke i Trangvik, as engineer Vang
 1927: Madame besøker Oslo, as Helge Wagelsten
 1933: Jeppe på bjerget, as the Baron
 1942: Det æ'kke te å tru, as Aalberg
 1942: Jeg drepte!, as Christensen
 1943: Sangen til livet, as general director Sigurd Braa
 1944: Kommer du, Elsa?, as Leif Rieber
 1946: To Liv, as supreme court lawyer Ivar Nordgaard
 1947: Sankt Hans fest, as bank director Christensen

External  links
 Erling Dragsholt at Norsk biografisk leksikon
 Photos of Erling Drangsholt, Oslo Museum
 Erling Drangsholt at IMDb
 Erling Drangsholt at Svensk Filmdatabas

References

20th-century Norwegian male actors
Norwegian male film actors
Norwegian male silent film actors
People from Kristiansand
1885 births
1950 deaths